KRI Teluk Penyu (513) is the second  of the Indonesian Navy.

Design 

She was powered by two diesel engines, with total sustained power output of  distributed in two shaft.

Teluk Penyu has a capacity of 200 troops,  of cargo (which includes 17 main battle tanks), and 2 LCVPs on davits. The ship has a complement of 90 personnel, including 13 officers.

She were armed with three single Bofors 40 mm L/70 guns, two single Rheinmettal 20 mm autocannons, and two single DShK 12.7 mm heavy machine guns.

The ship has helicopter decks in the amidships and aft for small to medium helicopter such as Westland Wasp or MBB Bo 105.

Construction and commissioning 
Teluk Penyu was built by Korea Tacoma Shipyard in Masan, ordered in June 1979. She was commissioned on 20 January 1981.

On 21 September 2007, she captured the MV Chokenavee 21. The ship was arrested while illegally fishing in Indonesian waters and as many as 250 tonnes of fish were found in the ship.

On 30 January 2016, she transported 900 ex-Gafatar followers to Tanjung Priok Port. She was the last ship that carried former Gafatar followers from Pontianak's Dwikora Port.

She was decommissioned on 16 August 2019.

Gallery

References

Bibliography
 

Ships built by Hanjin Heavy Industries
Amphibious warfare vessels of the Indonesian Navy
Teluk Semangka-class tank landing ships
1981 ships